Aisha Nazapa Braveboy (born July 29, 1974) is an American politician and attorney, who represented district 25 in the Maryland House of Delegates from 2007 to 2015. In 2018, she was elected as Prince George's County State's Attorney.

Background
Aisha is the daughter of Cuthbert and Norma Braveboy.

Born in Washington, D.C., State's Attorney Braveboy attended Melwood Elementary school, Kettering Middle school and graduated from Largo High School in 1992. She went on to the University of Maryland, College Park, and earned her B.A. in government & politics in 1997. Three years later she graduated from the Howard University School of Law with a J.D. and was admitted to the Maryland Bar in 2000. She is currently a member of the Maryland State Bar Association.

In the legislature
In 2006, Braveboy was elected to represent the 25th Legislative District in the Maryland General Assembly, succeeding Delegate Anthony Brown, who vacated his seat to run for lieutenant governor. She served on the House Economic Matters Committee, and chaired the Consumer Protection subcommittee.  She was the Chair of the Legislative Black Caucus of Maryland and a member of the Maryland's Women's Caucus.

She is a member of Sigma Gamma Rho sorority. She served as the National Chair of Legislative Action.

States attorney
Receiving 98.7 percent of the vote, Braveboy was elected in November 2018 to succeed Angela Alsobrooks as Prince George's County state's attorney. She won the race on a progressive platform, including saying she wanted to create more diversion programs for low-level offenders.

References

1974 births
Living people
African-American state legislators in Maryland
Politicians from Washington, D.C.
African-American lawyers
African-American women lawyers
Howard University School of Law alumni
Democratic Party members of the Maryland House of Delegates
State's attorneys in Maryland
University of Maryland, College Park alumni
Women state legislators in Maryland
21st-century American politicians
21st-century American women politicians
Lawyers from Washington, D.C.
21st-century African-American women
21st-century African-American politicians
20th-century African-American people
20th-century African-American women
21st-century American women lawyers